Wonsibanbon (Korean: 원시반본, Hanja: 原始反本) is one of the main teachings of Jeung San Do. Won(原) means "origin" or "primitive" and Shi(始) means "beginning" or "start". Ban(反) means "reverse" or "opposite" and Bon(本) means "origin" or "base". Its literal meaning is that returning to the origin.

How Wonsibanbon appears in our daily life? 
Before understanding Wonsibanbon further, it is recommended that you understand both Cosmic year and Gaebyeok because Wonsibanbon can be explained in more detail in the context of Cosmic year.

The one constant in the universe is change, and at the time of the Autumn Gaebyeok, the direction of that change is returning to the origin. In our lives we often have the desire to return to our origins whether it means returning home after a long journey, discovering our ethnic and cultural roots, seeking the original purpose of our lives, or returning to the origin of life through meditation. The practice of returning to the origin is discovering who we truly are. It can also entail solving a problem at its root.

Why Wonsibanbon is important? 
According to the eastern philosophy, everything is changing and it has its own cycle. It is not difficult to find a cycle. Even our planet earth has its own cycle. Spring, Summer, Autumn, and Winter. This cycle is divided with four different seasons, but the principle below is always yin and yang. 

When yang (positive energy) reaches its end, it must return to its origin. Just like a cannonball shot to the sky directly, it goes up to the sky and at a certain point, it returns to the ground. This action of return at the turning point is called Geukjeukban (克卽反). 

As it is explained above, earth's four seasons can be contained in yin and yang. Spring and summer represent yang (positive energy) and autumn and winter represents yin (negative energy). 

When summer reaches its end (end of positive energy), just like a cannonball reaches its turning point, it returns to its origin from its farther-reached-end.

This principle is important because Wonsibanbon is happening regardless we acknowledge it or not. Also, it is important to accept and do our action with Wonsibanbon this time of our life because it is natural like a shot cannonball returning to the ground from the sky. For this reason, many people meditate to be back to their origin.

Quote from Dojeon

There is dao.
within dao there is virtue.
from virtue there is edification.
from edification there is growth.
with growth there are people.
from people there are multitudes.
there is one person the multitudes would want to uphold.
they would uphold a sage king like Yao.
Dojeon 4:87:2-9

See also
 Boeun (Offering Gratitude and Repayment) 報恩
 Cosmic Year
 Shao Yung
 Dojang Dao center 道場
 Dojeon Sacred text of Jeung San Do 道典
 Gaebyeok 
 Haewon (Resolution of Bitterness and Grief) 解怨
 Jeung San Do
 Sangjenim 上帝
 Sangsaeng (Mutual life-giving) 相生
 Tae Eul Ju mantra 太乙呪
 Taemonim 太母

Jeung San Do